Patrick Timothy Riepma (February 15, 1961 – July 14, 2015) was an American football and baseball coach. He served two stints as the head football coach at Northwood University in Midland, Michigan, from 1993 to 2007, and again in 2014, compiling a record of record of 94–75–2.

Riepma was born on February 15, 1961, in Grand Rapids, Michigan. He died from lung cancer, on July 14, 2015, at his home in Midland..

Head coaching record

Football

References

External links
 Northwood profile

1961 births
2015 deaths
American football quarterbacks
Central Michigan Chippewas football coaches
Hillsdale Chargers baseball coaches
Hillsdale Chargers football coaches
Hillsdale Chargers football players
Northwood Timberwolves football coaches
High school football coaches in Michigan
Central Michigan University alumni
Sportspeople from Grand Rapids, Michigan
People from Jackson County, Michigan
Players of American football from Grand Rapids, Michigan
Deaths from lung cancer
Deaths from cancer in Michigan